Al-Hawj al-Qabli is a sub-district located in Ibb District, Ibb Governorate, Yemen. Al-Hawj al-Qabli had a population of  4889 as of 2004.

References 

Sub-districts in Al Dhihar District